Buenos Aires or Independencia is a sector in the city of Santo Domingo in the Distrito Nacional of the Dominican Republic.

It is characterized by its peaceful environment, as a contrast to the tumultuous and hectic pace found at its entrance. It is mostly a residential area, with few business establishments which are mainly located at the entrance of the area.

Sources 
Distrito Nacional sectors 

Populated places in Santo Domingo